Abdullah Moussa Al-Mayhoub, also known as Abdelallah Moussa El-myehoub was a member of the Libyan National Transitional Council representing the city of Al Qubah. He received a Doctor of Philosophy from a university in France and previously served as Dean of the law school at Benghazi University.

References

Members of the National Transitional Council
Libyan scholars
Libyan lawyers
Academic staff of the University of Benghazi
1955 births
2012 deaths